Marijn is a Dutch unisex given name derived from Marinus. Marijne is a feminine variant. Notable people with this name include:

Masculine name
 Marijn Backer (born 1956), Dutch columnist and writer
 (1819–1890), Dutch librarian and museum curator
 Marijn Dekkers (born 1957), Dutch-American manager and chemist
 Marijn Franx (born 1960), Dutch astronomer
 Marijn van Heugten (born 1997), Dutch footballer
 Marijn Heule, American computer scientist
 Marijn Lybaert, Belgian player of Magic: The Gathering
 Marijn Poels (born 1975), Dutch filmmaker
  (born 1982), Dutch composer, violinist and conductor
 Marijn Sterk (born 1987), Dutch football player
Feminine name
 Marijn van Dijk (born 1972), Dutch linguist
 Marijn Nijman (born 1985), Dutch cricketer
 Marijn Veen (born 1996), Dutch field hockey player
 Marijn de Vries (born 1978), Dutch road bicycle racer
 Marijne van der Vlugt (born 1965), Dutch musician, model and VJ

References

Unisex given names
Dutch masculine given names
Dutch feminine given names